Hasan Khan may refer to:

Places
 Hasan Khan, Golestan, a village in Iran
 Hasan Khan, Kurdistan, a village in Iran

People
 Hasan Khan (cricketer) (born 1998), Pakistani cricketer
 Hasan Imam Khan (born 1971), Bangladeshi politician

See also
 Hassan Khan (disambiguation)